The Devon Air Ambulance Trust (DAAT) is a charity providing emergency medical services through the provision of two helicopter-based air ambulances and two critical care cars, which cover the county of Devon in South West England.
The helicopters and cars are owned and operated by the charity, which raises money from public donations and its charity shops around £10.4million every year.

History
DAAT was formed by Ann Thomas, in memory of her son, 18-year-old Ceri Thomas, who was fatally injured in a road traffic collision in 1986.  
At hospital, his mother learned that the quicker a patient receives hospital treatment, the greater that patient's chances of survival. Subsequently, she started a campaign to launch an air ambulance service for Devon.

The service went into operation on 27 August 1992, covering the entirety of the county of Devon, including the rural and inaccessible moors of Exmoor and Dartmoor. The charity currently operates two helicopters, and can reach 50 per cent of locations in Devon within fiveminutes of taking to the air, with remaining locations accessible within 20minutes.

Organisation

DAAT owns and operates two helicopters, from two different airfields, to maximise coverage of the county. Both helicopters fly for ten hours a day, seven days a week. From late autumn 2016, the Exeter-based helicopter flew into the hours of darkness, up to midnight, into one of a network of community night-landing sites created across the county.

The Exeter-based Airbus Helicopters H145 registered G-DAAS, was delivered to DAAT in June 2020,
and entered into service in November 2020.
It is located along with the National Police Air Service helicopter at Exeter Airport.

The North Devon-based Eurocopter EC135 P2+ helicopter, registered G-DAAN, is located at Eaglescott Airfield, previously at Belle Vue Airfield, near Great Torrington.

In 2020, the charity introduced two critical care cars, both Volvo XC90, which allow the service to be delivered when helicopters are unable to fly.

Role
DAAT's mission statement is: "To relieve sickness and injury in and around the county of Devon through provision of an emergency Air Ambulance service". 
The charity provides air ambulance cover for the entire county. Up to 2019, the charity's paramedics were provided on secondment from  South Western Ambulance Service, but these are now DAAT employees.

Finances
DAAT typically receives no funding from the government (although in 2021 it received £317,000 in government grants), nor the National Lottery, relying instead on public and businesses donations, plus income generated by its shops and society lottery helps to meet annual running costs. In 2022, the charity raised £10.4M and spent £7.9M, of which £6.9M was used to operate the two air ambulances and critical care cars.

Both helicopters bear the signature of television presenter and patron Jennie Bond, who named the charity as her choice during her appearance in the show I'm a Celebrity...Get Me Out of Here!. The money raised enabled the charity to buy a GPS moving map system for the first helicopter.

BBC Radio Devon also ran a two-year appeal which raised the final £850,000 needed to buy a second owned aircraft (G-DAAN).

See also
 Air ambulances in the United Kingdom
 Cornwall Air Ambulance
 Dorset and Somerset Air Ambulance

References

External links

 
 

Air ambulance services in England
Dartmoor
Organisations based in Devon
Health in Devon